Sparton Records was a Canadian record company which was based in London, Ontario.

History
Sparton Records was founded in 1930 by the American electronics company Sparks-Withington Corp., of Jackson, Michigan, which made Sparton radios.  It manufactured and distributed Columbia Records in Canada from 1939 to 1954.  It had distribution arrangements with other American record companies, most notably ABC Records.  It was the first record company in Canada to manufacture stereo records in 1958. Sparton Records suffered a potentially fatal blow when ABC Records switched Canadian distribution from Sparton to Polydor Records in November 1968. While the record company folded the following year, Sparton Corporation is still in operation. Sparton closed its London operations in 2009.

Sparton Records artists
The Bill Smith Combo aka Tommy & The Tom Toms
Ward Allen
Paul Anka
Merle Haggard
Joyce Haun
The Page Quartet
Cliff McKay
Jimmy Namaro
Donn Reynolds
Ramblin' Lou Schriver
Lou Breese
Bob Scott
Don & Priscilla Wright
The Velvetones

References

Canadian independent record labels
Record labels established in 1930
Record labels disestablished in 1969
Companies based in London, Ontario
Defunct record labels of Canada